Reiteralm is part of the Schladminger 4-Berge-Schaukel, a network of four mountains. It is located in Austria.

References

External links
Reiteralm Official Website
Skii Info Website

Mountains of Styria
Tourist attractions in Styria
Schladming Tauern
Ski areas and resorts in Austria